Agonopterix latipennella is a moth in the family Depressariidae. It was described by Zerny in 1934. It is found in Lebanon.

References

Moths described in 1934
Agonopterix
Moths of the Middle East